This article is a list of notable people who were born in and/or have lived in Topanga, California.

Actors
In the 1920s, Topanga Canyon became a weekend getaway for Hollywood silent film stars. The rolling hills and ample vegetation provided both privacy and attractive surroundings for some of the famous.

Actors currently or formerly residing in the Topanga area include:

 John Kassir

 Richard Dean Anderson (1980)
 Blu del Barrio
 Lisa Bonet
 Eric Pierpoint
 Kyle Chandler
 John Clark
 Bob Denver
 Sharon Farrell
 Teri Garr
 Will Geer
 Billy Gray, and his late mother Beatrice Gray
 Emile Hirsch 
 Jennifer Holden
 Dennis Hopper
 Jason Isaacs
 Joshua Jackson
 Cloris Leachman
 Eric Mabius
 Wendie Malick
 Jason Momoa
 Viggo Mortensen
 Uschi Obermaier, model and actress
 William O'Leary
 Lynn Redgrave
 Molly Ringwald
 Joseph Rosendo
 Ricky Schroder
 Natalie Shaw
 Vinessa Shaw
 Amy Smart 
 Sissy Spacek
 Dean Stockwell
 Russ Tamblyn, raising his daughter Amber Tamblyn
 Jeffrey Tambor, with wife Kasia and 2 children
 Barry Watson
 Robin Williams
 Jan-Michael Vincent

Musicians
In the musical fields, in 1952 Woody Guthrie was one of the early American musicians who moved to the Topanga area. As nearby Los Angeles grew into a major music industry capital in the 1950s and 1960s, Topanga Canyon was one of the city's bohemian enclaves some performers preferred living in.

Current and former musicians of the Topanga area include:

 Nick Hexum

 Mark Andes 
 Christopher Drew
 Ryan Bingham
 Vic Briggs 
 Randy California 
 Linda Ronstadt
 Ed Cassidy
 Justin Chancellor
 Alice Cooper
 Pee Wee Crayton
 JC Crowley
 John Densmore
 Neil Diamond
 Danny Elfman in 1989 at the time he was composing the Simpsons Theme (see his MasterClass, Lesson 5)
 Don Felder
 Jay Ferguson
 Mick Fleetwood
 The Flying Burrito Brothers 
 Julia Fordham
 Leif Garrett 1970's teen idol
 Marvin Gaye
 Lowell George
 Woody Guthrie
 Colin Hay
 Richie Hayward
 John Helliwell 
  Gary Hinman, music teacher and a victim of the Charles Manson gang; lived on Old Topanga Canyon Road in 1969
 Bob Hite
 Jacknife Lee
 Adam Jones 
 Bernie Leadon 
 John Locke
 Elaine "Spanky" McFarlane
 Charles Milles Manson (né Maddox) cult leader
 Joni Mitchell
 Jim Morrison
 Van Morrison
 Hani Naser (1950–2020), Jordanian-American musician
 Grace Potter
 Billy Preston 
 Chris Robinson
 Ryan Ross
 Stephen Stills 
 Fred Tackett 
 Taj Mahal
 Big Joe Turner
 Alan Wilson
 Neil Young
 David Frank of The System

Writers
 Hugh Lofting, author of Dr Doolittle was living in Topanga at the time of his death in 1947.
 Millicent Borges Accardi, NEA poet, lives in Topanga and writes theater reviews for the local Topanga Messenger newspaper.
 Hampton Fancher, screenwriter, author, and director, lived for years on Old Canyon Boulevard.
 Marija Gimbutas, archaeologist and Indo-European scholar noted for her Kurgan hypothesis and books about neolithic goddess culture, lived in Topanga for decades.
 Al Martinez, Pulitzer Prize winning former L.A. Times columnist, lived for decades in Topanga, often commenting on the nature of life there.
 Jon Povill, writer of Total Recall and some episodes of Sliders, as well as producer of Star Trek: The Motion Picture resides there.
 Oliver Sacks, neurologist and author, lived on Iowa Trail in Topanga from 1963 to 1965.
Hope Edelman, writer of New York Times bestseller Motherless Daughters.

Others
 Henry Hill, gangster; moved to Topanga Canyon after he was put on probation in 2009
 Clement Meighan, archaeologist and UCLA Professor of Archaeology/Anthropology; resided in Topanga over 30 years.

References

Topanga, California
Topanga